The Temperance Billiard Hall at 131–141 King's Road, Chelsea, London, is a Grade II listed building with English Heritage.

It was built around 1912–14 to a design by Thomas Retford Somerford for Temperance Billiards Halls Ltd., and became an antiques centre in the 1960s. It is still retail premises. It is now connected to the former Chelsea Garage in 15 Flood Street, which is also Grade II listed.

Gallery

References

Grade II listed buildings in the Royal Borough of Kensington and Chelsea
Billiard halls
Temperance movement
Buildings and structures completed in 1914
King's Road, Chelsea, London